The Himalayan brown bear (Ursus arctos isabellinus), also known as the Himalayan red bear, isabelline bear or Dzu-Teh, is a subspecies of the brown bear and is known from northern Afghanistan, northern Pakistan, northern India, west China and Nepal. The bears are omnivorous and hibernate in dens during the winter. While the brown bear as a species is classified as Least Concern by the IUCN, this subspecies is critically endangered and populations are dwindling.

Description

Himalayan brown bears exhibit sexual dimorphism. They are usually sandy or reddish-brown in colour.

Distribution
The Himalayan brown bear occurs in Nepal, Tibet, west China, north India, north Pakistan,  Uzbekistan, Tajikistan, entire Kyrgyzstan and south-eastern Kazakhstan.

Phylogenetics and evolution
The Himalayan brown bear consists of a single clade that is the sister group to all other brown bears and the polar bear. The dating of the branching event, estimated at 658,000 years ago, corresponds to the period of a Middle Pleistocene episode of glaciation on the Tibetan plateau, suggesting that during this Nyanyaxungla glaciation, the lineage that gave rise to the Himalayan brown bear became isolated in a distinct refuge, leading to its divergence.

Phylogenetic analysis has shown that the Gobi bear clusters with the Himalayan brown bear and may represent a relict population of this subspecies.

Behaviour and ecology

The bears go into hibernation around October and emerge during April and May. Hibernation usually occurs in a den or cave made by the bear.

Feeding
Himalayan brown bears are omnivores and will eat grasses, roots and other plants as well as insects and small mammals; they also like fruits and berries. They will also prey on large mammals, including sheep and goats. Adults will eat before sunrise and later during the afternoon.

Threats and conservation
Until 2016, the Himalayan brown bear was listed as endangered in Nepal, India, Pakistan and Kyrgyzstan and as vulnerable in Tajikistan and in the Tian Shan Mountains.
The population in the Hindu Kush is small and isolated from the ones in the Karakoram and Pamir Mountains and in the Himalayas of Pakistan and India.

It is poached for fur and claws for ornamental purposes and internal organs for use in medicines. It is killed by shepherds to protect their livestock. In Himachal Pradesh, their home is the Kugti and Tundah wildlife sanctuaries and the tribal Chamba region. The tree bearing the state flower of Himachal, buransh, is the favourite habitat of the Himalayan brown bear. Due to the high value of the buransh tree, it is commercially cut causing further destruction to the brown bear's habitat.

Association with the Yeti

"Dzu-Teh", a Nepalese term, has also been associated with the legend of the Yeti, or Abominable Snowman, with which it has been sometimes confused or mistaken. During the Daily Mail Abominable Snowman Expedition of 1954, Tom Stobart encountered a "Dzu-Teh". This is recounted by Ralph Izzard, the Daily Mail correspondent on the expedition, in his book The Abominable Snowman Adventure.  A 2017 analysis of DNA extracted from a mummified animal purporting to represent a Yeti was shown to have been a Himalayan brown bear.

References

Further reading
 "Status and Affinities of the Bears of Northeastern Asia", by Ernst Schwarz Journal of Mammalogy 1940 American Society of Mammalogists.
 Ogonev, S.I. 1932, "The mammals of eastern Europe and northern  Asia", vol. 2, pp. 11–118. Moscow.
 Pocock R.I, "The Black and Brown Bears of Europe and Asia" Part 1. Journal of the Bombay Natural History Society., vol. 35, no. 4, pp. 772–823, figs 1-11. July 15, 1932.
 Ursus arctos, by Maria Pasitschniak, Published 23 April 1993 by "The American Society of Mammalogists"
John A. Jackson, "More than Mountains", Chapter 10 (pp 92) & 11, "Prelude to the Snowman Expedition & The Snowman Expedition", George Harrap & Co, 1954
 Charles Stonor, "The Sherpa and the Snowman", recounts the 1955 Daily Mail "Abominable Snowman Expedition" by the scientific officer of the expedition, this is a very detailed analysis of not just the "Snowman" but the flora and fauna of the Himalaya and its people. Hollis and Carter, 1955.
John A. Jackson, "Adventure Travels in the Himalaya" Chapter 17, "Everest and the Elusive Snowman", 1954 updated material, Indus Publishing Company, 2005.

External links 
 Video of Himalayan brown bear and a Tibetan fox on the hunt from PBS Video
 Red Bear
 Daily Mail Abominable Snowman
 Bear species found in India

Eurasian brown bears
Carnivorans of Asia
Fauna of the Himalayas
Mammals of Pakistan
Mammals of India
Mammals of Nepal
Mammals of Bhutan
Fauna of Jammu and Kashmir
Critically endangered biota of Asia